Ghooghat Lah Kunwar (Sindhi: گهونگهٽ لاھ ڪنوار) is a Sindhi language
film which was released on 18 September 1970 from Karachi. Saeeda and Waseem played leading roles in this film. Famous singer Noor Jahan and Mahedi Hassan were playback singers among others. The story is said to be written by Bashier Ahmed.

Details 
This Sindhi film was released on 18 September 1970 from Karachi, Sindh, Pakistan. The film was produced by Saleh Muhammad Bhatti and directed by Ghulam Hyder Siddiqui. The music director of this film was Imdad Hussain (1930 - 21 February 2000)  and lyrics were written by Syed Manzoor Naqvi. The dialogues of this film were written by the renowned writer Amar Jaleel. This was the first partially coloured Sindhi Pakistani movie.

Playback Singers 
This film became popular because of its lyrics. The noted Pakistani singer Noor Jahan and King of Ghazals Mehdi Hassan recorded lyrics of this film. Other notable playback singers  were  Runa Laila, Muhammad Yousuf and Irene Parveen.

This was first film of actor Waseem as a Hero. Saeeda was the Heroin. Other actors included Chakori, Hanif, Malik Anokho, Abdul Haque Abro, Khanum, Beena and Qamar.

References 

Sindhi-language films
Pakistani black-and-white films
1970 films